A backboard shattering (also known as backboard breaking or backboard smash) is an accident or stunt in basketball. It occurs when a player performs a slam dunk with sufficient force to shatter the tempered glass of the backboard, often causing the hoop to break off as well.  The stunt usually caused games to be canceled or delayed, incurring a foul for the offending player, serious injuries to occur and expensive costs of cleanup and replacement.  Shattering a backboard can be dangerous, sending various small pieces of the backboard glass flying over the players, sideline press personnel, referees, and spectators. In the National Basketball Association (NBA), shattering a backboard during a game is penalized with a "non-unsportsmanlike" technical foul and a possible fine towards the player. The player may not be ejected, nor shall the foul count towards a player's total towards either ejection or suspension. The referee also has latitude to waive off the foul, if it is determined the shattering was accidental due to a defect in the backboard or its structure, the board was broken during a rebound of the ball from a jump shot, or if the player had no intentions to dunk with force.

Throughout the history of basketball there have always been athletes with the size and strength to slam dunk the ball through the rim. However, the first NBA player to shatter a backboard, Chuck Connors (who would become far more famous as an actor), did not do so with a dunk. When playing for the Boston Celtics in 1946, Connors took a set shot during pregame warmups, hitting the front of the rim. Because an arena worker had failed to place a protective piece between the rim and backboard, the backboard shattered. All-star power forward Gus Johnson of the Baltimore Bullets became famous as a backboard breaker in the NBA, shattering three during his career in the 1960s and early 1970s.  In the American Basketball Association (ABA), Charlie Hentz shattered two backboards in the same game on November 6, 1970, resulting in the game being canceled. An invention by Arthur Ehrat to create the breakaway rim with a spring on it led to the return of the dunk in college basketball.

An often cited game with a backboard smash was on August 26, 1985. Michael Jordan dunked so hard during a Nike exhibition game in Trieste that the backboard was completely broken. The signed jersey and shoes (including one of the tiny shards of glass in the sole of the left shoe) that Michael Jordan wore during the famous Shattered Backboard game were later auctioned. The moment the glass was broken in Trieste was filmed and is often cited around the world as a particularly important milestone in Jordan's rise.

Darryl Dawkins and Shaquille O'Neal gained notoriety for shattering backboards during their careers; Dawkins's incidents are credited for being the impetus for the research and introduction of breakaway rims throughout the sport, while O'Neal slam dunked with enough force to break the supports holding two backboards during games against the New Jersey Nets and the Phoenix Suns during the 1992–93 NBA season. Following the 1992–93 season, the NBA increased steel brace strength and increased stability of the backboard to prevent the hoop from falling down. A technical foul for purposeful backboard shattering, differentiating from an accidental shatter by the determination of intent, was also introduced.

References

1946 introductions
basketball terminology